Wiehler is a surname. Notable people with the surname include:

 Hans Wiehler (1930–2003), German botanist
 Zygmunt Wiehler (1890–1977), Polish composer and director

See also
 Wiehle
 Wieler